Jacob Welsh Miller (August 29, 1800September 30, 1862) was a United States senator from New Jersey.

Early life
In 1800, Miller was born in German Valley, New Jersey (in Washington Township, Morris County), United States, North America. He attended the public schools, studied law, was admitted to the bar in 1823, and practiced in Morristown.

Career
In 1832, Miller was elected to the New Jersey General Assembly. From 1839 to 1840, he then represented Morris County in the New Jersey Legislative Council (now the New Jersey Senate).

In 1839, Miller was elected as a Whig to the state Senate, and to the U.S. Senate in 1841. He was reelected in 1847, and served from March 4, 1841, to March 3, 1853. While in the Senate, he was chairman of the committee on the District of Columbia (Twenty-seventh and Twenty-eighth Congresses).

He joined the Republican Party in 1855.

Personal life
In 1825, Miller married Mary Louisa Macculloch, the daughter of George P. Macculloch, a wealthy Morristown engineer and businessman who had designed and built the Morris Canal. They had nine children, including attorney George Macculloch Miller, and Captain Lindley Miller, who served as an officer of a black infantry regiment during the Civil War and wrote "Marching Song of the First Arkansas".

In 1862, Miller died in Morristown, New Jersey. He was interred in St. Peter's Parish Churchyard.

References

Bibliography

Macculloch-Miller Family Archives, Macculloch Hall Historical Museum, Morristown, NJ.

External links
 

1800 births
1862 deaths
Members of the New Jersey General Assembly
Members of the New Jersey Legislative Council
United States senators from New Jersey
New Jersey Whigs
19th-century American politicians
New Jersey lawyers
People from Washington Township, Morris County, New Jersey
Politicians from Morris County, New Jersey
Whig Party United States senators
19th-century American lawyers